The 2012 FIM Scandinavian Speedway Grand Prix will be the tenth race of the 2012 Speedway Grand Prix season. It took place on September 8 at the G&B Stadium in Målilla, Sweden.

The Grand Prix was won by Tomasz Gollob who beat Chris Holder, Antonio Lindbäck and Nicki Pedersen in the final.

Riders 
The Speedway Grand Prix Commission nominated Thomas H. Jonasson as Wild Card, and Kim Nilsson and Linus Sundström both as Track Reserves. Injured Kenneth Bjerre was replaced by first Qualified Substitutes, Martin Vaculík. The draw was made on September 7.
 (7)  Kenneth Bjerre → (19)  Martin Vaculík

Results

Heat details

Heat after heat 
 (58,46) Sayfutdinov, B.Pedersen, Holder, Crump
 (58,21) Lindgren, Andersen, Vaculík, Jonasson
 (58,53) Ljung, N.Pedersen, Lindbäck, Harris
 (58,69) Gollob, Hancock, Hampel, Jonsson
 (57,94) Sayfutdinov, Vaculík, Jonsson, N.Pedersen (X)
 (58,82) Crump, Harris, Lindgren, Hampel
 (58,12) Hancock, Andersen, Ljung, B.Pedersen
 (59,57) Lindbäck, Holder, Gollob, Jonasson
 (58,53) Gollob, Lindgren, Sayfutdinov, Ljung
 (59,13) Lindbäck, Crump, Vaculík, Hancock
 (59,94) N.Pedersen, Hampel, Jonasson, B.Pedersen
 (59,53) Holder, Harris, Andersen, Nilsson
 (59,78) Lindbäck, Hampel, Sayfutdinov, Andersen
 (59,71) Jonasson, Crump, Ljung, Sundström
 (59,84) Gollob, B.Pedersen, Harris, Vaculík
 (59,93) Lindgren, N.Pedersen, Holder, Hancock
 (58,14) Hancock, Sayfutdinov, Jonasson, Harris
 (59,77) Gollob, N.Pedersen, Crump, Andersen
 (59,84) Lindbäck, B.Pedersen, Lindgren, Nilsson
 (60,21) Holder, Vaculík, Hampel, Ljung
 Semifinals
 (57,89) Lindbäck, N.Pedersen, Sayfutdinov, Hancock
 (59,05) Holder, Gollob, Lindgren, Crump
Final
 (59,55) Gollob, Holder, Lindbäck, N.Pedersen

The intermediate classification

References

See also 
 motorcycle speedway

Scandinavia
2012
Speedway Grand Prix Scandinavia